Böhrnsen is a German surname. Notable people with the surname include:

 Jens Böhrnsen (born 1949), German politician
 Gustav Böhrnsen (1914–1998), German politician

German-language surnames